Greek numbers may refer to:

 Greek numerals, the system of representing numbers using letters of the Greek alphabet
 Greek numbers, the names and symbols for the numbers 0–10 in the list of numbers in various languages

See also
 Numeral prefix
 Roman numbers

    
Greek language